A presidential sash is a cloth sash worn by presidents of many nations in the world. Such sashes are worn by presidents in Africa, Asia, Europe and, most notably, in Latin America.

The sash is an important symbol of the continuity of the presidency, and is only worn by the president. Its value as a symbol of the office of the head of state can be compared to that of a crown in monarchies. Presidents leaving office formally presents the sash to their successor as part of the official inauguration ceremony.

Presidential sashes are usually very colorful and very large and designed to resemble the nation's flag, especially those of Latin American presidents. They are usually worn over the right shoulder to the left side of the hip. The national coat of arms is also usually placed on the sash. A national order's star or chain of office can also be worn.

Gallery

Current national leaders

Former national leaders

See also 
 Livery collar
 O'Higgins Pioche

External links
 

Ceremonial clothing
Fashion accessories
Formal insignia
Sashes
Presidents